The Grey House (German: Das graue Haus) is a 1926 German silent drama film directed by Friedrich Feher and starring Magda Sonja, Erna Morena and Werner Krauss. It was shot at the Staaken Studios in Berlin. The film's sets were designed by the art director Alfred Kunz.

Cast
 Magda Sonja as Maria  
 Erna Morena as Hochstaplerin  
 Werner Krauss as Vater  
 Gretl Dupont as Die Spitzbübin  
 Angelo Ferrari as Hochstapler  
 Alf Blütecher as Herzog 
 Lotte Lorring as Die Herzogin  
 Gustav Adolf Semler as Arzt  
 Julia Serda as Mutter  
 Georg John as Der Henker  
 Eva Speyer as Die Kranke

References

Bibliography
 Bock, Hans-Michael & Bergfelder, Tim. The Concise CineGraph. Encyclopedia of German Cinema. Berghahn Books, 2009.

External links

1926 films
Films of the Weimar Republic
Films directed by Friedrich Feher
German silent feature films
German black-and-white films
Films shot at Staaken Studios